Pakistan Mobile Communications Limited, doing business as Jazz, is a Pakistani mobile network and internet services provider formed by the merger of Mobilink and Warid Pakistan.

It provides a range of services for prepaid and postpaid customers to individual and corporate clients. It is headquartered in Islamabad, and the current CEO is  Aamir Hafeez Ibrahim.

History 
Formerly known as Mobilink, the company was founded in 1994 as a joint venture between Saif Group and Motorola Inc. In February 2001, Egypt based Orascom Investment Holding bought Motorola’s shares in Jazz to become the majority shareholder with 69% control. Then, in June 2007, Orascom further purchased the remaining shares under Saif Group’s control to become Jazz’s 100% owner.

In 2010, Russian operator VEON agreed to acquire most of the telecom assets of Orascom, including Jazz, in a $6.5 billion deal, creating the world’s fifth-largest mobile network operator by subscriber base.
In November 2015, VEON announced the 100% acquisition of Pakistan’s Warid Telecom, a subsidiary of Abu Dhabi Group. Completed in July 2016 after due approvals, the first-ever local telecom company acquisition created a combined subscriber base of 50 million.

Following the merger of Mobilink and Warid Pakistan, Mobilink was officially rebranded to Jazz in 2017. As of July 2022, Jazz has 75 million subscribers in Pakistan, among which 39 million are 4G subscribers.

VEON will buy the remaining 15% shares in Jazz from Abu Dhabi Group for 100pc ownership.

Network 
Jazz has over 12,500 active cell sites in the country, with over 25,000 kilometers of fiber-optic cables laid. Huawei, Nokia-Siemens, and ZTE are the primary vendors for networking equipment at Jazz, including Radio Base Stations, Microwave equipment and network switches. Jazz has invested over 9 billion US Dollars in Pakistan till date.

In 2014, Jazz participated in the 2014 NGMS auction held by PTA, which allowed them to bid for a 3G license, and a 10 MHz block in the 2100 MHz band was allocated to Jazz.

In March 2017, Jazz inaugurated their Network Operations Center (NOC) which makes use of IBM and Dell EMC products to manage day-to-day network operations and provides the company with 24x7 network surveillance.

Radio Frequency Summary 

Jazz's participation in the 2014 NGMS Auction held by PTA allowed them to bid for the 3G license, which included a 10 MHz block in the 2100 MHz band. In July 2014, they announced that they have over 10,000 3G and 9,000 4G ready cell sites. Jazz did not bid for any 4G spectrum in the 2014 NGMS auction.

Post-merger with Warid Pakistan, Jazz was able to use Warid Pakistan's license allowing them to become an 4G network using a 5 MHz block in the 1800 MHz band. In May 2017, Jazz won the 2017 NGMS auction held by PTA. This includes a 10 MHz block in the 1800 MHz (FDD-LTE Band 3) frequency to be used for Jazz 4G. Jazz was also awarded additional 4G spectrum on 30 June 2017 by PTA.

4G+ / LTE-A launch 
Jazz has refarmed a 10 MHz block from its 900 MHz spectrum for carrier aggregation with their existing 1800 MHz 4G spectrum. The LTE-A network would be rolled out to cater for growing demand. This makes them the third carrier after Telenor Pakistan and Zong 4G to officially launch LTE-A in the country.

In July 2021, Jazz upgraded its existing LTE network to LTE-A Pro, with the introduction of 256-QAM and Massive MIMO. It is currently the only network in Pakistan that is offering 3CA (Tri-band) carrier aggregation and 256-QAM on its LTE network.

VoLTE testing 
Jazz tested VoLTE in May 2017 with its partners Huawei and Nokia, announced in a press statement. It is the first operator in Pakistan to prepare for the launch of VoLTE in the country.

Jazz has rolled out VoLTE across its network, with supported devices including Samsung, Huawei, Oppo, Vivo, Itel, Xiaomi, Realme, Infinix and Jazz Digit branded feature phones.

5G Trials 
In January 2020, Jazz had reported that they had successfully carried out 5G trials with reaching speeds of 1.5Gbps. These trials were carried out on the 2.6 GHz spectrum.

Subsidiaries

JazzCash 

Jazz had partnered with Mobilink Microfinance Banking to make an entry into the branchless banking market, initially launched under the MobiCash brand name, it was later changed to JazzCash. It is a direct competitor to Telenor Pakistan's Easypaisa. It allows users to pay bills, send and receive money and purchase top-ups for prepaid mobile numbers.

Branding 
Jazz appointed Ertugrul Ghazi famed Esra Bilgic as its Brand Ambassador.

References 

Jazz (mobile network operator)
VEON
Internet service providers of Pakistan
Pakistani brands
Pakistani subsidiaries of foreign companies
Mergers and acquisitions of Pakistani companies
Companies based in Islamabad
Pakistani companies established in 2017
Telecommunications companies established in 2017